Happiness Ahead may refer to:
 Happiness Ahead (1934 film), an American comedy film
 Happiness Ahead (1928 film), a silent film drama